Connor Murphy (born 8 September 1995) is an English professional rugby union player. He plays as a scrum half for the Houston Sabercats in Major League Rugby, previously coming through the academy ranks at London Irish.

References

1995 births
Living people
English expatriate rugby union players
English expatriate sportspeople in the United States
Expatriate rugby union players in the United States
Houston SaberCats players
People from Sunbury-on-Thames
Rugby union scrum-halves